Sheffield City Council is the city council for the metropolitan borough of Sheffield in South Yorkshire, England. It consists of 84 councillors, elected to represent 28 wards, each with three councillors. It is currently under No Overall Control, with Labour, the Liberal Democrats and the Green Party each holding chair positions in a proportionate number of committees, with Labour chairing four Committees, the Liberal Democrats chairing three and the Greens chairing two.

History
The council was founded as the Corporation of Sheffield in 1843, when Sheffield was incorporated (see History of Sheffield). In 1889, it attained county borough status and in 1893 city status. In 1974, the Local Government Act 1972, reconstituted the City Council as a metropolitan district council of South Yorkshire, governed also by South Yorkshire County Council. It established a system of 90 councillors, three to each of 30 wards. This was reduced in 1980 with the merger of the Attercliffe and Darnall wards to 87 councillors in 29 wards.

In 1986, the abolition of metropolitan county councils saw Sheffield City Council become a unitary authority, the modern equivalent of the county borough it had been before 1974.

In 2004, the local wards were completely reorganised, producing 28 new wards and 84 councillors.

In April 2014, the Sheffield City Council voted to recognize the right to self-determination of Somaliland, an autonomous region in northwestern Somalia, the first city council to do so. The gesture is purely ceremonial and carries no legal weight. The UK government and the international community officially recognise Somaliland as a part of Somalia.

In August 2019, a governance petition was submitted to the council, asking for a referendum on changing the council's governance system. The petition, organised by the Sheffield community group It's Our City!, was signed by over 26000 people (approximately 6.6% of the Sheffield City Council electorate). In September 2019 this petition was accepted as valid under the provisions of the Localism Act 2011, forcing the council to hold a referendum on changing the council's executive arrangements from the Leader and Cabinet system to a Committee system. The referendum was postponed from May 2020 (due to the COVID-19 pandemic) and took place on 6 May 2021, with 65% voting for change to a Committee system.

Political control

Since 2021 the council has been under no overall control. At the 2021 elections, Labour lost its majority on the council, and its leader, Bob Johnson, lost his seat on the council. A coalition between Labour and the Greens was formed to run the council, with Labour's new leader Terry Fox taking the role of leader of the council. Following the 2022 election, the Liberal Democrats joined Labour and the Greens in the ruling administration.

Council as service provider and employer
Sheffield City Council provides approximately 550 services to its citizens.  It is also a major employer in the city, with more than 8,000 employees, including all state school staff in its role as Local Education Authority (LEA). In April 2021 the Sheffield Star published a list of seven Council employees earning more than £100k-a-year.

Services and employees are organised into four portfolios:

Resources Portfolio – responsible for corporate resources and organisational development.
Children, Young People and Families's Portfolio – equivalent to an LEA and responsible for early years, primary, secondary and special schools, children and families' social care, looked-after children and youth offending.
Place Portfolio – responsible for planning, housing, maintaining and repairing the social housing stock, environmental regulation, parks and countryside, street maintenance and cleanliness, and cultural activities.
Communities Portfolio – responsible for libraries, local governance, community safety and adult social services, including physical disability, learning disability and older people.

The Council is responsible for 16 cemeteries across the city.

Other functions are performed by partners and contractors of the council:
Amey manage the city's 'Streets Ahead' project including management of highways.
Veolia manages household waste disposal.
Capita provides HR, payroll and IT services for council employees. However this will be delivered 'in house' by Sheffield City Council from April 2020.

See also
Lord Mayor of Sheffield

References

External links
Sheffield City Council
Sheffield Labour Party
Sheffield Lib Dems
Sheffield Green Party
Sheffield Conservatives

Local government in Sheffield
Metropolitan district councils of England
Councillors in South Yorkshire
Local education authorities in England
Local authorities in South Yorkshire
Billing authorities in England
Leader and cabinet executives
1974 establishments in England